Valter Gabrielsen (4 February 1921 – 23 December 1999) was a Norwegian politician for the Norwegian Labour Party.

He was born in Fjell.

He was elected to the Norwegian Parliament from Finnmark in 1965, and was re-elected on three occasions. He had previously served in the position of deputy representative during the terms 1958–1961 and 1961–1965.

Gabrielsen was involved in local politics in Vardø and Nordkapp municipalities between 1959 and 1967.

References

1921 births
1999 deaths
Labour Party (Norway) politicians
Members of the Storting
20th-century Norwegian politicians